Alejandra Weinstein Procuna (born August 14, 1969, Mexico City, Mexico), is a Mexican actress. Her parents are Ernesto Weinstein Peña and Amparo Procuna Chamorro and she is the niece of writer Marcia del Río.

Filmography

Films

Television roles

References

External links 
 

1969 births
Living people
Mexican film actresses
Mexican telenovela actresses
Mexican television actresses
Actresses from Mexico City
20th-century Mexican actresses
21st-century Mexican actresses